Nicholas Sutton (by 1465-1532/33), of Rye, Sussex, was an English Member of Parliament.

He was a Member (MP) of the Parliament of England for Rye in 1497, 1510, 1512, 1515 and 1529. He was Mayor of Rye 1509–11, 1516–17, 1519–20, July–August 1529 and 1531–2.

References

15th-century births
1533 deaths
16th-century English people
People from Rye, East Sussex
16th-century English MPs
People of the Tudor period
Mayors of Rye, East Sussex
Members of the Parliament of England (pre-1707)